Kadambangudi is a village in the Thanjavur taluk of Thanjavur district, Tamil Nadu, India.

Demographics 

As per the 2001 census, Kadambangudi had a total population of 1149 with  567 males and  582 females. The sex ratio was 1005. The literacy rate was 68.18.

References 

 

Villages in Thanjavur district